The following is a list of medical schools (or universities with a medical school) in South America.

South America

Argentina

Medical School of the Austral University
Medical School of the Fundación H. A. Barceló
Medical School of the Catholic University of Cordoba
Medical School of the Interamerican Open University
Medical School of the Instituto Universitario CEMIC
Medical School of the National University of Comahue
Medical School of the National University of La Matanza
Medical School of the National University of Córdoba
Medical School of the National University of Cuyo
Medical School of the  National University Arturo Jauretche
Medical School of the National University of Entre Ríos
Medical School of the National University of Formosa
Medical School of the National University of the Litoral
Medical School of the National University of the Northeast
Medical School of the National University of Salta
Medical School of the National University of the South
Medical School of the National University of Tucumán
Medical School of the River Plate Adventist University
Medical School of the Universidad de Maimónides
Medical School of the Universidad de Morón
Medical School of the Universidad del Salvador
Medical School of the Universidad Favaloro
Medical School of the Universidad Nacional de La Plata
Medical School of the National University of Mar del Plata
Medical School of the University of Buenos Aires
Medical School of the University of Mendoza
Medical School of the University of Rosario
Medical School of the University of Tucumán

Bolivia
Faculty of Medicine of the Universidad Autónoma Tomás Frías
Universidad de Aquino de Bolivia 
Faculty of Medicine of the Universidad Católica Boliviana San Pablo
Faculty of Medicine of the Universidad Católica Boliviana San Pablo, Santa Cruz
Faculty of Medicine of the Universidad Mayor de San Andrés, La Paz
Faculty of Medicine of the Universidad Mayor de San Simon, Cochabamba
Faculty of Medicine of the Universidad Nuestra Señora de La Paz
Faculty of Medicine of the Universidad Privada del Valle, Cochabamba
Faculty of Science of Human Heath of Universidad Autónoma Gabriel Rene Moreno, Santa Cruz.

Brazil
There are 259 medical schools in Brazil. This is the second largest in the world, surpassing the number of medical schools in China and the United States. The number of medical schools in Brazil is only surpassed by India, which has 341 schools.

Brasília - Federal District
Course of Medicine, Catholic University of Brasília, Brasília
Faculty of Medicine of the Central Planalt, Uniplac, Brasília
Faculty of Medicine of the University of Brasília, Brasília
Medical Course, Escola Superior de Ciências da Saúde, Brasília

Rio de Janeiro State
Course of Medicine, Faculty of Biological and Health Sciences, Universidade de Nova Iguaçu, Itaperuna campus
Course of Medicine, Faculty of Biological and Health Sciences, Universidade de Nova Iguaçu, Nova Iguaçu campus
Course of Medicine of the Universidade Estácio de Sá, Rio de Janeiro
Faculty of Medicine of Campos dos Goitacazes
Faculty of Medicine of the Federal Fluminense University
Faculty of Medicine of the Federal University of Rio de Janeiro
Faculty of Medicine of Federal University of Rio de Janeiro State
Faculty of Medicine of Teresópolis
Faculty of Medicine of the Universidade Gama Filho
Faculty of Medicine of Valença
Faculty of Medicine of Vassouras
Institute of Medical Sciences, Rio de Janeiro State University
Petrópolis Medical School
Medical School of the Universidade do Grande Rio (UNIGRANRIO)
Medical School of the Universidade Souza Marques, Rio de Janeiro
School of Medical Sciences of Volta Redonda

São Paulo State
Course of Medicine, Universidade de Mogi das Cruzes, Mogi das Cruzes
Department of Medicine of the Federal University of São Carlos, São Carlos
Faculty of Medical Sciences of the Pontifical Catholic University of Campinas
Faculty of Medical Sciences of Santa Casa de São Paulo, São Paulo City
Faculty of Medical Sciences of the State University of Campinas, Campinas
Faculty of Medical Sciences of the Universidade São Francisco, Bragança Paulista
Faculty of Medicine of ABC, Santo André
Faculty of Medicine of Botucatu of the State University of São Paulo (UNESP)
Faculty of Medicine of Catanduva (FAMECA)
Faculty of Medicine of the Centro Universitário Barão de Mauá, Ribeirão Preto
Faculty of Medicine of Fernandópolis
Faculty of Medicine of Jundiai
Faculty of Medicine of Marília
Faculty of Medicine of the Metropolitan University of Santos
Faculty of Medicine of Ribeirão Preto of the University of São Paulo, Ribeirão Preto
Faculty of Medicine of São José do Rio Preto (Famerp)
Faculty of Medicine of Sorocaba of the Pontifical Catholic University of São Paulo
Faculty of Medicine of Taubaté
Faculty of Medicine of the Universidade de Marília
Faculty of Medicine of the Universidade de Ribeirão Preto (UNAERP)
Faculty of Medicine of the Universidade Nove de Julho, São Paulo City
Faculty of Medicine of University of Santo Amaro, São Paulo City
Faculty of Medicine of the University of São Paulo, São Paulo City
Medical Course of the Centro Universitario Lusíada, Santos
Medical Faculty of the Universidade do Oeste Paulista, Presidente Prudente
School of Medicine of Federal University of São Paulo, São Paulo City

Minas Gerais State
Course of Medicine, State University of Montes Claros (UNIMONTES)
Faculty of Medical Sciences of Alfenas
Faculty of Medical Sciences of Itajubá
Faculty of Medical Sciences of Minas Gerais (FELUMA), Belo Horizonte
Faculty of Medicine of Barbacena
Faculty of Medicine of Caratinga
Faculty of Medicine of the Federal University of Juiz de Fora
Faculty of Medicine of the Federal University of Minas Gerais, Belo Horizonte
Faculty of Medicine of the Federal University of Uberlândia
Faculty of Medicine of Ipatinga
Faculty of Medicine of Patos de Minas
Faculty of Medicine of Pouso Alegre
Faculty of Medicine of Triângulo Mineiro, Uberaba
Medical Course of the University of Uberaba

Espírito Santo State
Faculty of Medicine of Federal University of Espírito Santo, Vitória, Espírito Santo
Faculty of Medicine of UNESC, Colatina, Espírito Santo
Faculty of Medicine of University of Vila Velha
Medical School of Santa Casa de Misericórdia of Vitória, Espírito Santo

Rio Grande do Sul State
Course of Medicine of the Lutheran University of Brazil, Canoas, Rio Grande do Sul
Faculty of Medicine, Federal University of Rio Grande, Rio Grande, Rio Grande do Sul
Faculty of Medicine of the Federal University of Rio Grande do Sul, Porto Alegre, Rio Grande do Sul
Faculty of Medicine of the Pontifical Catholic University of Rio Grande do Sul, Porto Alegre, Rio Grande do Sul
Faculty of Medicine of the Universidade de Passo Fundo, Rio Grande do Sul
Faculty of Medicine of the Universidade Federal de Ciências da Saúde de Porto Alegre
Faculty of Medicine of the University of Caxias do Sul, Rio Grande do Sul
Medical Course, Federal University of Pelotas, Pelotas, Rio Grande do Sul
Medical Course, Federal University of Santa Maria, Santa Maria, Rio Grande do Sul
Medical School of the Universidade Católica de Pelotas
Faculty of Medicine of Universidade do Vale do Rio dos Sinos, São Leopoldo, Rio Grande do Sul

Santa Catarina State
Course of Medicine, Universidade Comunitária Regional de Chapecó (UNOCHAPECÓ) Chapecó
Course of Medicine, Universidade da Região de Joinville
Course of Medicine, Universidade do Extremo Sul Catarinense (UNESC), Criciúma
Course of Medicine, Universidade do Sul de Santa Catarina (UNISUL), Tubarão
Course of Medicine, Universidade do Vale do Itajaí
Faculty of Medicine of the Regional University of Blumenau
Medical Course of the Federal University of Santa Catarina, Florianópolis

Paraná State
Course of Medicine of the Federal University of Paraná, Curitiba
Course of Medicine of the State University of Maringá, Maringá
Course of Medicine of the University Center Fundação Assiz Gurgacz, Cascavel 
Course of Medicine of the State University of West Paraná (UNIOESTE), Cascavel
Evangelical Faculty of Medicine of Paraná (FEPAR), Curitiba
Faculty of Medicine, Pontifical Catholic University of Paraná, Curitiba
Faculty of Medicine, State University of Londrina, Londrina

North States
Belém Medical School, State University of Pará (UEPA), Belém
Course of Medicine, Federal University of Acre (UFAC), Rio Branco, Acre
Course of Medicine, Federal University of Roraima, Boa Vista, Roraima
Course of Medicine, State University of Amazonas, Manaus, Amazonas
Faculty of Medicine, Centro Universitário Nilton Lins, Manaus, Amazonas
Faculty of Medicine, Federal University of Pará, Belém
Faculty of Medicine, Federal University of Tocantins, Palmas, Tocantins
Faculty of Medicine, ITPAC, Araguaina, Tocantins
Faculty of Medicine, ITPAC, Porto Nacional, Tocantins
Faculty of Medicine of the Federal University of Amazonas, Manaus, Amazonas
Faculty of Medicine of the Regional University of Gurupi, Gurupi, Tocantins
Faculty of Medicine, University of Rondônia, Porto Velho, Rondônia
Marabá Medical School, State University of Pará (UEPA), Marabá
Medical Course, Centro Universitário do Pará, Belém
Santarém Medical School, State University of Pará (UEPA), Santarém

Northeastern States
Bahia School of Medicine and Public Health, Salvador, Bahia
Centro universitário Christus (UniChristus), Fortaleza, Ceará
Department of Medicine, Federal University of Sergipe, Aracaju, Sergipe
Escola Pernambucana de Medicina, Recife, Pernambuco
Faculty of Medical Sciences of the University of Pernambuco, Recife, Pernambuco
Faculty of Medicine Nova Esperança FAMENE, João Pessoa, Paraíba
Faculty of Medicine of the Federal University of Alagoas, Maceió, Alagoas
Faculty of Medicine of the Federal University of Bahia, Salvador, Bahia
Faculty of Medicine of the Federal University of Ceará, Barbalha, Ceará
Faculty of Medicine of the Federal University of Ceará, Fortaleza campus, Ceará
Faculty of Medicine of the Federal University of Ceará, Sobral, Ceará
Faculty of Medicine of the Federal University of Maranhão, São Luís, Maranhão
Faculty of Medicine of the Federal University of Paraíba, João Pessoa, Paraíba
Faculty of Medicine of the Federal University of Pernambuco, Recife, Pernambuco
Faculty of Medicine of the Federal University of Piauí, Teresina, Piauí
Faculty of Medicine of the Federal University of Rio Grande do Norte, Natal, Rio Grande do Norte
Faculty of Medicine of Juazeiro do Norte, Ceará
Faculty of Medicine of the State University of Feira de Santana, Feira de Santana, Bahia
Faculty of Medical Sciences of the State University of Piauí (UESPI), Teresina, Piauí
Faculty of Medicine of the State University of Santa Cruz, Ilhéus, Bahia
Faculty of Medicine of the State University of Southeast of Bahia, Vitória da Conquista, Bahia
Medical Course of the Federal University of Campina Grande, Campina Grande, Paraíba
Nucleus of Life Sciences of the Federal University of Pernambuco, Caruaru, Pernambuco
School of Medical Sciences of Alagoas, Maceió, Alagoas
School of Medicine of the State University of Ceará, Fortaleza, Ceará
University of Fortaleza, Unifor, Fortaleza, Ceará

Center-Western States
Course of Medicine of the Federal University of Mato Grosso do Sul, Campo Grande, Mato Grosso do Sul
Faculty of Medicine of Campos Dourados of the Federal University of Mato Grosso do Sul, Mato Grosso do Sul
Faculty of Medicine of the Federal University of Goiás, Goiânia
Faculty of Medical Sciences of the Federal University of Mato Grosso, Cuiabá, Mato Grosso
Faculty of Medicine of the Pontifical Catholic University of Goiás, Goiânia
Faculty of Medicine of the Universidade para o Desenvolvimento do Estado e da Região do Pantanal (UNIDERP), Campo Grande
Faculty of Medicine of the University of Cuiabá (UNIC), Cuiabá

Chile
Pontificia Universidad Católica de Chile
Universidad Austral de Chile
Universidad Católica de la Santísima Concepción
Universidad de los Andes
Universidad de Antofagasta
Universidad de Chile
Universidad de Concepción
Universidad de La Frontera
Universidad de Santiago de Chile
Universidad de Valparaíso
Universidad del Desarrollo
Universidad Diego Portales
Universidad Finis Terrae
Universidad Mayor
Universidad Nacional Andrés Bello
Universidad San Sebastián
Universidad Autonoma de Chile

Colombia
Colegio Mayor de Nuestra Senora del Rosario, Facultad de Medicina, Bogotá
Universidad de Nariño, Facultad de Ciencias de la Salud, Pasto, Nariño
Escuela de Medicina Juan N. Corpas, Bogotá
Fundación Universitaria de Boyacá, Facultad de Medicina, Tunja, Boyacá
Fundación Universitaria de Ciencias de la Salud (FUCS), Bogotá
Fundación Universitaria San Martín, Facultad de Medicina, Santa Fé de Bogotá
Pontificia Universidad Javeriana Facultad de Medicina, Santa fé de Bogotá
Universidad Antonio Nariño, Facultad de Medicina, Santa fé de Bogotá
Universidad Autónoma de Bucaramanga, Facultad de Medicina, Campus el Bosque, Bucaramanga, Santander
Universidad CES, Facultad de Medicina, Medellín, Antioquia
Universidad de los Andes, Facultad de Medicina, Santa Fé de Bogotá
Universidad de Antioquia, Facultad de Medicina, Medellín, Antioquia
Universidad de Caldas, Facultad de Ciencias de la Salud, Medicina, Manizale, Caldas
Universidad de Cartagena, Facultad de Medicina, Bolivar
Universidad de Ciencias Aplicadas y Ambientales (UDCA), Facultad de Ciencias de la Salud, Campus Universitario, Santa Fé de Bogotá
Universidad de la Sabana, Facultad de Medicina, Chía, Cundinamarca
Universidad de Santander (UDES), Facultad de Medicina, Bucaramanga, Santander
Universidad del Bosque, Escuela Colombiana de Medicina, Santa Fé de Bogotá
Universidad del Cauca, Facultad de Ciencias de la Salud - Medicina, Popayán, Cauca
Universidad del Norte, Ciencias de la Salud - Facultad de Medicina, Barranquilla
Universidad del Quindío, Facultad de Ciencias de la Salud - Medicina, Armenia, Quindío
Universidad del Sinú, Escuela de Medicina, Bolìvar
Universidad del Tolima, Facultad de Medicina, Ibagué, Tolima
Universidad del Valle, Facultad de Salud,  Escuela de Medicina, Cali, Valle
Universidad Icesi, Cali, Valle
Universidad Industrial de Santander, Bucaramanga, Santander
Universidad Industrial de Santander, Escuela de Medicina, Facultad de Salud, Bucaramanga, Santander
Universidad Libre de Colombia, Seccional Atlántico, Facultad de Medicina, Barranquilla, Atlántico
Universidad Libre de Colombia, Seccional Cali, Facultad de Medicina y Ciencias de la Salud, Cali, Valle
Universidad Metropolitana, Ciencias de la Salud, Barranquilla, Atlántico
Universidad Militar Nueva Granada, Facultad de Medicina y Ciencias de la Salud, Santa Fé de Bogotá
Universidad Nacional de Colombia, Facultad de Medicina, Ciudad Universitaria, Santa Fé de Bogotá
Universidad Pedagogica y Tecnologica de Colombia, Facultad de Ciencias de la Salud - Escuela de Medicina, Tunja - Boyacá
Universidad Pontificia Bolivariana, Facultad de Medicina, Medellín, Antioquia
Universidad Surcolombiana, Facultad de Ciencias de la Salud, Facultad de Medicina, Neiva, Huila
Universidad Tecnologica de Pereira, Facultad Ciencias de la Salud, Pereira, Risaralda
Universidad Sanitas De Colombia (Unisanitas), Facultad de ciencias de la Salud, Bogota, Colombia.

Ecuador
Facultad de Ciencias de la Salud Eugenio Espejo, Quito
Faculty of Medicine, Central University of Ecuador, Quito
Faculty of Medicine, Pontificia Universidad Católica del Ecuador, Quito
Faculty of Medicine, La Universidad de Guayaquil, Guayaquil
School of medicine, Universidad Técnica de Machala, Machala.
Faculty of Medicine, Universidad Espíritu Santo, Guayaquil
Faculty of Medicine, Universidad Estatal de Cuenca, Cuenca
Medical School, Universidad San Francisco de Quito, Quito
Faculty of Medicine, Universidad Católica de Santiago de Guayaquil, Guayaquil, Ecuador
Faculty of Medicine, Universidad de Las Américas, Quito, Ecuador

Guyana
American International School of Medicine
Georgetown American University
GreenHeart Medical University
Rajiv Gandhi University of Science and Technology
Texila American University
University of Guyana

Paraguay
Universidad Maria Auxiliadora de San Estanislao "UMAX SANTANI", Santani
Universidad Católica "Nuestra Señora de la Asunción", Villarrica
Universidad Nacional de Asunción, Facultad de Ciencias Medicas, Asunción
Universidad Nacional de Itapua, Facultad de Medicina, Encarnacion
Universidad Nacional de Concepción, Facultad de Medicina, Concepción 
Universidad Central Del Paraguay, Facultad de Ciencias de la Salud, Pedro Juan Caballero

Peru 
Faculty of Medicine "Alberto Hurtado" of the Universidad Peruana Cayetano Heredia, Lima
Faculty of Medicine "Hipólito Unanue" of the Universidad Nacional Federico Villarreal, Lima
Faculty of Medicine of Universidad Nacional de San Agustin, Arequipa
Faculty of Medicine "San Fernando" of the Universidad Nacional Mayor de San Marcos, Lima
Faculty of Medicine of Universidad Peruana Unión, Lima
Faculty of Medicine of Scientific University of the South, Lima
Faculty of Medicine of Catholic University of Santa María, Arequipa
Faculty of Medicine of Universidad Cesar Vallejo, Trujillo
Faculty of Medicine of Universidad Nacional de Trujillo, Trujillo
Faculty of Medicine of Universidad Nacional del Altiplano, Puno
Faculty of Medicine of Universidad Particular de Chiclayo, Lambayeque
Faculty of Medicine of Universidad Privada San Juan Bautista, Lima
Faculty of Medicine of Universidad Ricardo Palma, Lima
Faculty of Medicine of University of San Martín de Porres, Lima
Faculty of Medicine of Universidad Peruana de Ciencias Aplicadas, Lima
Faculty of Medicine of University of Piura, Lima

Uruguay
Universidad de La Republica, Manuel Quintela's Hospital 
Facultad de Medicina CLAEH, Punta del Este

Venezuela
Faculty of medicine of the Central University of Venezuela at Caracas
Faculty of medicine of the University of The Andes at Merida
Faculty of medicine of the University of The Andes at San Cristobal
Faculty of medicine of the University of Zulia at Maracaibo
Faculty of medicine of the University of Carabobo at Valencia
Faculty of medicine of the University of Carabobo at Maracay
Faculty of medicine of the University of Oriente at Anzoategui
Faculty of medicine of the University of Oriente at Ciudad Bolivar
Faculty of medicine of the Universidad Centro Occidental Lisandro Alvarado at Barquisimeto
Faculty of medicine of the Universidad Nacional Experimental Francisco de Miranda at Coro
Faculty of medicine of the Universidad Nacional Experimental de los Llanos Centrales Rómulo Gallegos at San Juan de los Morros
Faculty of medicine of the Universidad Nacional Experimental de los Llanos Centrales Rómulo Gallegos at Valle de la Pascua
Faculty of medicine of the Universidad Nacional Experimental de los Llanos Centrales Rómulo Gallegos at Calabozo

References

External links
 World Directory of Medical Schools

South America
Education in South America
Health in South America